Hans Keller (born 1 September 1931) is a German speed skater. He competed in three events at the 1956 Winter Olympics.

References

External links
 

1931 births
Possibly living people
German male speed skaters
Olympic speed skaters of the United Team of Germany
Speed skaters at the 1956 Winter Olympics
Place of birth missing (living people)
20th-century German people